The following outline is provided as an overview of and topical guide to Algeria:

Algeria – former French colony and the largest country in Africa, located in the Maghreb region of Northwest Africa with Algiers as its capital.

General reference 

 Pronunciation: or 
 Common English country name: Algeria
 Official English country name: The People's Democratic Republic of Algeria
 Common endonym(s): Dzayer, Al-Jazā'ir, الجزائر
 Official endonym(s): Tagduda Tadzayrit Tugduyant Tagherfant, الجمهورية الجزائرية الديمقراطية الشعبية
 Adjectival(s): Algerian
 Demonym(s):
 Etymology: Name of Algeria
 International rankings of Algeria
 ISO country codes:  DZ, DZA, 012
 ISO region codes:  See ISO 3166-2:DZ
 Internet country code top-level domain:  .dz

Geography of Algeria 

Geography of Algeria
 Algeria is: a country
 Population of Algeria: 45,400,000 people  (2022 estimate) - 32th most populous country
 Area of Algeria: 2,381,741 km2 (919,595 sq mi) - 10th largest country
 List of Algerian provinces by area
 Atlas of Algeria

Location 
 Algeria is situated within the following regions:
 Northern Hemisphere and lies on the Prime Meridian
 Africa
 Sahara Desert
 North Africa
 Maghreb
 West Africa
 Time zone:  West Africa Time (UTC+01)
 Extreme points of Algeria
 High:  Mount Tahat 
 Low:  Chott Melrhir 
Land boundaries:  6,343 km
 982 km
 965 km
 1,608 km
 463 km
 1,376 km
 956 km
Coastline:  998 km

Environment of Algeria 

 Climate of Algeria
 Ecoregions in Algeria
 Earthquakes in Algeria
 Geology of Algeria
 Protected areas of Algeria
 Biosphere reserves in Algeria
 National parks of Algeria
 Wildlife of Algeria
 Fauna of Algeria
 Birds of Algeria
 Insects of Algeria
 Butterflies of Algeria
 Mammals of Algeria

Natural geographic features of Algeria 

 Glaciers in Algeria: none 
 Rivers of Algeria
 World Heritage Sites in Algeria

Regions of Algeria

Ecoregions of Algeria 

List of ecoregions in Algeria

Administrative divisions of Algeria 

 Provinces of Algeria
 Districts of Algeria
 Municipalities of Algeria (baladiyahs)

Provinces of Algeria 

Provinces of Algeria

 List of Algerian provinces by area
 List of Algerian provinces by population
 Alphabetical list of provinces
Adrar
Aïn Defla
Aïn Témouchent
Algiers
Annaba
Batna
Béchar
Béjaïa
Biskra
Blida
Bordj Bou Arréridj
Bouira
Boumerdès
Chlef
Constantine
Djelfa
El Bayadh
El Oued
El Tarf
Ghardaïa
Guelma
Illizi
Jijel
Khenchela
Laghouat
M'Sila
Mascara
Médéa
Mila
Mostaganem
Naama
Oran
Ouargla
Oum el-Bouaghi
Relizane
Saida
Sétif
Sidi Bel Abbes
Skikda
Souk Ahras
Tamanghasset
Tébessa
Tiaret
Tindouf
Tipasa
Tissemsilt
Tizi Ouzou
Tlemcen

Districts of Algeria 

Districts of Algeria
The provinces of Algeria are divided into 553 districts (daïras).

Municipalities of Algeria 

Municipalities of Algeria
The districts of Algeria are divided into 1,541 municipalities.
 Cities of Algeria
 Capital of Algeria: Algiers

Demography of Algeria 

Demographics of Algeria
 List of Algerian provinces by population

Government and politics of Algeria 

Politics of Algeria
 Form of government: presidential republic
 Capital of Algeria: Algiers
 Elections in Algeria
 Political parties in Algeria
 Taxation in Algeria

Branches of the government of Algeria 

Government of Algeria

Executive branch of the government of Algeria 
 Head of state: President of Algeria
 Head of government: Prime Minister of Algeria
 Council of Ministers of Algeria

Legislative branch of the government of Algeria 

 Parliament of Algeria (bicameral)
 Upper house: Council of the Nation
 Lower house: People's National Assembly

Judicial branch of the government of Algeria 

Court system of Algeria

Foreign relations of Algeria 

Foreign relations of Algeria
 Diplomatic missions in Algeria
 Diplomatic missions of Algeria
 Algeria–Japan relations
 Algeria–Libya relations
 Embassy of Algeria in Washington, D.C.
 Embassy of Algeria, Kyiv
 Embassy of Algeria, London
 Embassy of Algeria, Ottawa
 Visa policy of Algeria

International organization membership 

International organization membership of Algeria
The People's Democratic Republic of Algeria is a member of:

African Development Bank Group (AfDB)
African Union (AU)
Arab Bank for Economic Development in Africa (ABEDA)
Arab Fund for Economic and Social Development (AFESD)
Arab Maghreb Union (AMU)
Arab Monetary Fund (AMF)
African Petroleum Producers Organization (APPO)
Bank for International Settlements (BIS)
Food and Agriculture Organization (FAO)
Group of 15 (G15)
Group of 24 (G24)
Group of 77 (G77)
International Atomic Energy Agency (IAEA)
International Bank for Reconstruction and Development (IBRD)
International Chamber of Commerce (ICC)
International Civil Aviation Organization (ICAO)
International Criminal Court (ICCt) (signatory)
International Criminal Police Organization (Interpol)
International Development Association (IDA)
International Federation of Red Cross and Red Crescent Societies (IFRCS)
International Finance Corporation (IFC)
International Fund for Agricultural Development (IFAD)
International Hydrographic Organization (IHO)
International Labour Organization (ILO)
International Maritime Organization (IMO)
International Mobile Satellite Organization (IMSO)
International Monetary Fund (IMF)
International Olympic Committee (IOC)
International Organization for Migration (IOM)
International Organization for Standardization (ISO)
International Red Cross and Red Crescent Movement (ICRM)

International Telecommunication Union (ITU)
International Telecommunications Satellite Organization (ITSO)
International Trade Union Confederation (ITUC)
Inter-Parliamentary Union (IPU)
Islamic Development Bank (IDB)
League of Arab States (LAS)
Multilateral Investment Guarantee Agency (MIGA)
Nonaligned Movement (NAM)
Organisation of Islamic Cooperation (OIC)
Organization for Security and Cooperation in Europe (OSCE) (partner)
Organisation for the Prohibition of Chemical Weapons (OPCW)
Organization of American States (OAS) (observer)
Organization of Arab Petroleum Exporting Countries (OAPEC)
Organization of Petroleum Exporting Countries (OPEC)
United Nations (UN)
United Nations Conference on Trade and Development (UNCTAD)
United Nations Educational, Scientific, and Cultural Organization (UNESCO)
United Nations High Commissioner for Refugees (UNHCR)
United Nations Industrial Development Organization (UNIDO)
United Nations Institute for Training and Research (UNITAR)
United Nations Organization Mission in the Democratic Republic of the Congo (MONUC)
Universal Postal Union (UPU)
World Customs Organization (WCO)
World Federation of Trade Unions (WFTU)
World Health Organization (WHO)
World Intellectual Property Organization (WIPO)
World Meteorological Organization (WMO)
World Tourism Organization (UNWTO)
World Trade Organization (WTO) (observer)

Law and order in Algeria 

Law in Algeria
 Constitution of Algeria
 Crime in Algeria
 Human trafficking in Algeria
 Human rights in Algeria
 Freedom of speech in Algeria
 Censorship in Algeria
 Blasphemy law in Algeria
 LGBT rights in Algeria
 Freedom of religion in Algeria
 Polygamy in Algeria
 Law enforcement in Algeria
 List of Algerian prisons
 Visa policy of Algeria

Military of Algeria 

Military of Algeria
 Command
 Commander-in-chief: President of Algeria, Abdelaziz Bouteflika
 Forces
 Army of Algeria
 Navy of Algeria
 Air Force of Algeria
 Algeria and weapons of mass destruction
 Military history of Algeria
 Defense industry of Algeria

History of Algeria 

History of Algeria
 Archeology of Algeria

By period 
 Prehistoric Central North Africa
 North Africa during the Classical Period
 Medieval Muslim Algeria
 Ottoman rule in Algeria
 French Algeria
 Nationalism and resistance in Algeria
 Algerian War of Independence
 History of Algeria (1962–99)
 Algerian Civil War (1990s)
 2000s in Algeria (2000s)

By subject 
 Conflicts in Algeria
 Earthquakes in Algeria
 History of the Jews in Algeria
 Massacres in Algeria
 Military history of Algeria

Culture of Algeria 

Culture of Algeria
 Architecture of Algeria
 Tallest structures in Algeria
 Cuisine of Algeria
 Languages of Algeria
 Media in Algeria
 Museums in Algeria
 National symbols of Algeria
 Coat of arms of Algeria
 Flag of Algeria
 National anthem of Algeria
 People of Algeria
 Algerian people
 Specific Algerians
 Algerian writers
 Women in Algeria
 Ethnic groups in Algeria
 Chinese people in Algeria
 Europeans in Algeria
 Public holidays in Algeria
 Scouting and Guiding in Algeria
 World Heritage Sites in Algeria

Art in Algeria 
 Cinema of Algeria
 List of Algerian films
 List of Algerian submissions for the Academy Award for Best Foreign Language Film
 Literature of Algeria
 DZ-manga
 Music of Algeria
 Television in Algeria

Religion in Algeria 

 Religion in Algeria
 Bahá'í Faith in Algeria
 Christianity in Algeria
 Protestantism in Algeria
 Protestant Church of Algeria
 Roman Catholicism in Algeria
 Catholic churches in Algeria
 Hinduism in Algeria
 Islam in Algeria
 Mosques in Algeria
 Shia Islam in Algeria
 Judaism in Algeria
 History of the Jews in Algeria

Sports in Algeria 

Sports in Algeria
 Football in Algeria
 Football clubs in Algeria
 Algeria at the Olympics
 Rugby union in Algeria
 List of Algerian records in swimming

Economy and infrastructure of Algeria 

Economy of Algeria
 Economic rank, by nominal GDP (2007):  50th (fiftieth)
 Agriculture in Algeria
 Banking in Algeria
 Banks in Algeria
 Communications in Algeria
 Media of Algeria
 Newspapers in Algeria
 Telecommunications in Algeria
 Telephone numbers in Algeria
 Internet in Algeria
 Companies of Algeria
 Currency of Algeria: Dinar
ISO 4217: DZD
 Defense industry of Algeria
 Energy in Algeria
 Nuclear energy in Algeria
 Power stations in Algeria
 Renewable energy in Algeria
 Health care in Algeria
 Health in Algeria
 Mining in Algeria
 Retail sector in Algeria
 Shopping malls in Algeria
 Supermarket chains in Algeria
 Tourism in Algeria
 Visa policy of Algeria
 Trade unions in Algeria
 Transport in Algeria
 Air transport in Algeria
 Airlines of Algeria
 Airports in Algeria
 Busiest airports in Algeria
 Rail transport in Algeria
 Shipping in Algeria
 List of Algerian ships
 Water supply and sanitation in Algeria
 Water privatization in Algeria

Education in Algeria 

Education in Algeria
 National Library of Algeria
 Museums in Algeria
 Universities in Algeria

See also 

Algeria

Index of Algeria-related articles
List of Algeria-related topics
List of international rankings
Member state of the United Nations
Outline of Africa
Outline of geography

References

External links

 
Photos From Algeria (Arabic)
El Mouradia official presidential site (in French and Arabic)
National People's Assembly official parliamentary site
 Algeria. The World Factbook. Central Intelligence Agency.

Algeria
Algeria